The Lover & the Beloved is the fifth studio album by American singer and songwriter Donna de Lory, released on January 31, 2004 by Ajna Music. The project contains six mantras composed by De Lory and producer Dave Dale. De Lory's interpretation of "Govinda Jaya Jaya" originally appeared on her fourth studio album, In the Glow (2003).

Track listing

References 

2004 albums
Donna De Lory albums